Dragovit was a pagan ruler (prince or chief) of the Veleti ("king of the Wiltzes"). It is thought that Dragovit began his rule c. 740.

Because of their constant hatred and hostility toward the Franks, in the late 8th century, Frankish king Charlemagne organised campaigns against the Veleti, and fellow  Slavic tribe of the Linonen. With the aid of Frisian, Obodrite, Saxon and Sorbian reinforcements, Charlemagne managed to cross the Elbe River, advancing toward the Havel River into Veleti territory. Outnumbered, Dragovit, in 789, was forced to pledge loyalty to the Franks and surrender hostages. Among others, Dragovit was also forced to pay a tribute and accept the influence of Christian missionaries among his people.

His capital was a fortification known as civitas Dragowiti (City of Dragovit). Its location is hypothesised to be either at Brandenburg an der Havel or Demmin.

Notes
 Obodrites and Sorbs are also of Slavic stock.

References

8th-century Slavs
Lechites
Year of birth unknown
Year of death unknown
Slavic warriors